Firefly is a common name for a bioluminescent beetle in the family Lampyridae.

Firefly or fireflies may also refer to:

Organizations and companies
 Firefly (airline), a subsidiary of Malaysia Airlines
 Firefly (car rental), an international car hire company owned by Hertz
 Firefly Aerospace, a private aerospace firm based in Austin, Texas; formerly "Firefly Space Systems"
 Firefly Arts Collective, a New England regional burning event
 Firefly Distillery, a distillery based in South Carolina that manufactures a line of vodka products
 Firefly Tonics, an English producer of fruit juice drinks with added herbal extracts
 Firefly Learning, an educational technology company from London
 Firefly Studios, a computer game developer from London

Entertainment

Fictional elements
 Firefly (DC Comics), a Batman villain
 Firefly (Archie Comics), a character in the Archie comic book universe
 Firefly (G.I. Joe), a villain in the G.I. Joe universe, member of Cobra
 Rufus T. Firefly, a character played by Groucho Marx in the 1933 film Duck Soup
 The Firefly family, a group of characters created by Rob Zombie
 The Fireflies, a rebel militia in the game The Last of Us

Film and television
 Firefly (TV series), a 2002 science fiction TV program created by Joss Whedon
 Firefly (franchise), a science fiction franchise stemming from the TV program created by Joss Whedon
 Firefly (2000 film), a Japanese film directed by Naomi Kawase
 Firefly (2005 film), an independent film directed by Pete Marcy
 The Firefly (1937 film), the 1937 film adaptation of the Rudolf Friml operetta starring Allan Jones
 "The Firefly" (Fringe), a 2011 episode of the television series Fringe
 The Firefly (2015 film), a Colombian film directed by Ana Maria Hermida
 Fireflies (film), a 2014 film
 Fireflies (TV series), a 2004 Australian TV series

Literature
 Firefly, a science-fiction novel by Piers Anthony
 Firefly (novel), a 2021 novel by Philippa Dowding
 Fireflies, a memoir by David Morrell
 Fireflies (novel), a 1970 novel by Shiva Naipaul
 The Firefly, a novel by P. T. Deutermann

Music
 Firefly Music Festival, an annual American music festival held in Dover, Delaware
 The Firefly (operetta), a 1912 operetta by Rudolf Friml

Bands
 Fire Flies, an American rock band based in New York City
 The Fireflies, an American doo wop group
 Firefly (band), the Filipino Indie rock bands

Albums
 Firefly (Emily Remler album), 1981
 Firefly (Jeremy Steig album), 1977
 Firefly (TNT album), 1997
 Firefly (Uriah Heep album), 1977
 Firefly (Sara Storer album), 2005
 Firefly, a 2001 album by Garnet Rogers
 Fireflies (Faith Hill album), 2005
 Fireflies (Frodus album), 1995
 Fireflies, 1998, by Rubygrass, fronted by Oskar Saville

Songs
 "Firefly" (Christina Metaxa song), the Cypriot entry to the Eurovision Song Contest 2009, sung by Christina Metaxa
 "Firefly" (Cy Coleman song), recorded by Tony Bennett in 1958
 "Firefly", a song recorded by Tony Bennett and Lady Gaga on their 2014 album Cheek to Cheek
 "Firefly" (InMe song), 2002
 "Fireflies" (Leona Lewis song), 2012
 "Fireflies" (Owl City song), 2009
 "Fireflies" (Zendaya song), 2013
 "Fire Fly", a song by Mike Oldfield on his 2002 Tr3s Lunas album
 "Fire Fly", a song by Childish Gambino on his 2011 Camp album
 "Firefly", a song by American Music Club on their 1988 California album
 "Firefly", a song by Blackfield on their 2013 album, Blackfield IV
 "Firefly", a song by A*Teens on their 2001 Teen Spirit album
 "Firefly", a song by Saves the Day on their 2001 Stay What You Are album
 "Firefly", a song by BeForU on their 2003 self-titled album
 "Firefly", a song by Breaking Benjamin on their 2004 We Are Not Alone album
 "Fireflies", a song by Fleetwood Mac on their 1980 album Live
 "Fire Flies", a song by Gorillaz on their 2018 album The Now Now
 "Fireflies", a song by Patti Smith from her 1996 album Gone Again
 "Fireflies", a song by JJ Grey & MOFRO on their 2004 album Lochloosa
 "Fireflies", a song by Finch on their 2005 Say Hello to Sunshine album
 "Fireflies", a song by Rhett Miller on his 2006 The Believer album
 "Fireflies", a song by Chris Garneau from his 2009 El Radio album
 "Fireflies", a song by Richard Rawson featuring Tom Parker
 "Euphoria (Firefly)", a song by Delerium
 "Fireflies", a song by Sam and the Womp

Other uses in entertainment
 The Firefly (operetta), by Rudolf Friml
 Firefly Role-Playing Game, a role-playing game by Margaret Weis Productions

Vehicles and transportation technology

Air

Airplanes
 Fairey Firefly, a 1940s British, naval, reconnaissance and fighter aircraft
 Fairey Firefly I, a 1920s British biplane fighter project (cancelled)
 Fairey Firefly IIM, a 1930s British biplane fighter
 Kolb Firefly, an American ultralight aircraft
 MBB Lampyridae 'Firefly', a German stealth fighter project during the 1980s
 Slingsby T67 Firefly, a British light training aircraft

Drones
 Globe KD2G Firefly, an American target drone
 Ryan AQM-91 Firefly, an American long-range reconnaissance drone

Helicopters
 Sikorsky Firefly, an all-electric helicopter built for research purposes

Land

Automobile
 Pontiac Firefly, a subcompact automobile based on the Suzuki Cultus
 Fiat Global Small Engine, marketed as "Firefly"

Rail
 Firefly (train), a U.S. passenger train operated by the St. Louis - San Francisco Railway
 GWR Firefly Class, a class of steam locomotive on the Great Western Railway
 Firefly, a steam locomotive operated by the Orange and Alexandria Railroad

Military
 Sherman Firefly, a British variant of the M4 Sherman military tank

Nautical
 Firefly (1843), a ship used by the colony of Victoria for a rescue party for the Burke and Wills expedition in northern Australia, 1861
 Firefly (dinghy), a type of sailing dinghy
 Firefly (Taiping Rebellion steamer), an armed Chinese steamer used in the 1860s
 , several ships of the Royal Navy
 HMT Firefly, a British trawler that operated between 1930 and 1961
 USS Firefly (1814), a brig formerly named Volant

Space
 FireFly (spacecraft), an asteroid-searching spacecraft proposed by Deep Space Industries
 Firefly Alpha, a small orbital-class rocket in development

Technology

Hardware
 Firefly PC Remote, a remote control by SnapStream Media used to control Windows-based computers
 Firefly (mobile phone), a simplified cellphone designed for young children

Computers
 Firefly (supercomputer), a supercomputer
 DEC Firefly, a multiprocessor workstation

Software
 Firefly (cache coherence protocol), a method of caching used in the DEC Firefly
 Firefly (computer program), an ab initio computational chemistry software
 Firefly (key exchange protocol), a security protocol used in telephony
 Fireflies (computer graphics), a rendering artifact
 Firefly algorithm, an algorithm for mathematical optimization
 Firefly Media Server, an audio media server for the Roku SoundBridge and iTunes

Other uses
 Firefly Estate, Jamaica
 Firefly (website), an online community developed in the late 1990s

See also

 Firefly Festival (disambiguation)
 
 
 
 
 
 Fire (disambiguation)
 Fly (disambiguation)